Ulysse, the French spelling of Ulysses, is a masculine French given name. Notable people with the name include:

Ulysse Adjagba (born 1993), French basketball player
Ulysse Bozonnet (1922–2014), French ski mountaineer
Ulysse Chevalier (1841–1923), French bibliographer and historian
Ulysse Delécluse (1907–1995), French clarinetist
Ulysse Gémignani (1906–1973), French sculptor
Ulysse Trélat (politician) (1798–1879), French doctor and politician
Ulysse Trélat (1828–1890), French surgeon

See also
Ulysse (Rebel), an opera
Ulysses (disambiguation)

French masculine given names